In Praise of Dreams is a jazz album by Jan Garbarek that was released by ECM in 2004. In 2005, it was nominated for the Grammy for "Best Contemporary Jazz Album".

Track listing 
All compositions by Jan Garbarek.

"As Seen from Above" – 4:42
"In Praise of Dreams" – 5:22
"One Goes There Alone" – 5:09
"Knot of Place and Time" – 6:27
"If You Go Far Enough" – 0:44
"Scene from Afar" – 5:19
"Cloud of Unknowing" – 5:26
"Without Visible Sign" – 5:04
"Iceburn" – 5:02
"Conversation with a Stone" – 4:25
"A Tale Begun" – 4:39

Personnel 
 Jan Garbarek – soprano saxophone, tenor saxophone, synthesizers
 Kim Kashkashian – viola (tracks 2-4, 6-10)
 Manu Katché – drums, percussion, samples

References

External links 
 Jan Garbarek - In Praise of Dreams (2004) album review by Thom Jurek, credits & releases at AllMusic
 Jan Garbarek - In Praise of Dreams (2004) album releases & credits at Discogs

2004 albums
Jan Garbarek albums
ECM Records albums
Albums produced by Manfred Eicher